Ligularia stenocephala is a species of the genus Ligularia and the family Asteraceae.  It used to be Senecio.

References

External links

stenocephala